Bentonville may refer to:

Bentonville, Arkansas
 Downtown Bentonville, Bentonville, Arkansas, United States
 Bentonville Municipal Airport (KVBT, VBT), Benton County, Arkansas, United States
 Bentonville Train Station, Bentonville, Arkansas, United States
Bentonville, Indiana, unincorporated community in central Posey Township
Bentonville, North Carolina, former town near Four Oaks
Battle of Bentonville, American Civil War battle fought in the former town of Bentonville, North Carolina
 Bentonville Battlefield, the Bentonville Battleground State Historic Site
Bentonville, Texas, unincorporated community in Jim Wells County, Texas,

See also
 Bentonville High School, Bentonville, Arkansas, United States
 Bentonville School District, Benton County, Arkansas, United States
 Benton (disambiguation)
 Benton City (disambiguation)
 Benton Station (disambiguation)
 Fort Benton (disambiguation)